Sabyasachi Mukherjee (born 23 February 1974) is an Indian fashion designer, jewelry designer, retailer and couturier from Kolkata, India. Since 1999, he has sold designer merchandise using the label Sabyasachi. Mukherjee is one of the Associate Designer Members of Fashion Design Council of India and the youngest board member of the National Museum of Indian Cinema.He has designed costumes for Bollywood films such as Guzaarish, Baabul, Laaga Chunari Mein Daag, Raavan, and English Vinglish.

Biography

Early life
Sabyasachi comes from a middle-class Bengali family. Around 1947, his parents emigrated to India from what was then East Pakistan (now Bangladesh). Sabyasachi is originally from Kakinara, West Bengal. His early education was from Sri Aurobindo Vidyamandir, Chandannagar.

Career

During the summer of 1999, Sabyasachi Mukerjee graduated from the National Institute of Fashion Technology India. Four months later, he started his eponymous which began with a workforce of three people. In 2001, he won the Femina British Council’s most outstanding young Designer of India award, which took him to London for an internship with Georgina von Etzdorf, an eclectic designer based in Salisbury. Returning home with ideas, Sabyasachi started retailing at all major stores in India.

In 2002, Sabyasachi Mukerjee participated at the India Fashion Week which got positive feedbacks from the press. During the spring of 2003, he made his first international runway, with the "Grand Winner Award" at the Mercedes Benz New Asia Fashion week in Singapore, which paved his way to a workshop in Paris by Jean Paul Gaultier and Azzedine Alaia. In his collection "Kora" at the Lakme Fashion Week 2003, he used unbleached and hand woven fabrics with Kantha and other hand embroideries.

In 2004, Sabyasachi took a step ahead with Kuala Lumpur Fashion Week and The Miami Fashion Week with a bohemian take on Indian textiles and his collection was called "The Frog Princess". His significant achievements included his coveted showing in Browns earning him a retail place at the tiny London store voted by Vogue as the best shopping destination in the world, thereby establishing himself as one of the most promising young designers for years to come.

In 2005, his spring-summer collection, "The Nair Sisters" was inspired by hand block printing, embroideries, bagru prints and the extensive use of cotton and other hand woven fabrics. The collection was sold at Browns & Selfridges in London. He was requested to showcase his collections at the prestigious Oxford University annual black tie charity dinner fashion show.

2006, Sabyasachi’s debut Spring Summer collection’07 at New York Fashion Week earned him critical acclaim and his label started selling world-wide. The essence of this collection was based on folklore, glamour, simplicity, modern architecture and intricate detailing. There was a marked influence of paintings from the seventeenth and eighteenth century like Brueghel, Claude Monet and others. He used dark jeweled colors with muted shades accentuated with subtle texturing and indigenous embroidery. He is the only Indian designer to be a part of all three leading fashion weeks: New York, Milan and London.
Sabyasachi believes that the unique positioning of Indian designers is due to the exclusivity of his homeland with its rich history and culture. He believes that Indian designers bring a flavor to the west that is no longer perceived as only exotic but also a rich blend of individuality and sensitivity.

2007, Sabyasachi participated at the New York and at the London Fashion Weeks plus Bridal Asia 2007, Lakme Fashion Week and the Vogue launch event in India. His "Sanctuary" collection showcased at Lakme Fashion Week Fall Winter 08 received positive reviews from the fashion editor of the New York Times, Suzy Menkes.

Sabyasachi closed the third edition of PCJ Delhi Couture Week (8–12 August 2012) with his New Moon collection inspired by the flavours of five cities of the world- straitjacket discipline of New York, the nostalgia of the British Raj in Kolkata, the subversive decadence of Berlin, the romanticism of Paris and bohemian flair of Barcelona. Bollywood star Sridevi was the showstopper & walked the ramp for the designer in a sari. The designer is showcasing this collection in UAE as well. Sabyasachi launched in 2008 a line of jewelry exclusively designed by himself, in association with the GAJA brand. The collection was showcased at the Vogue Wedding Show 2016. He launched his exclusive menswear collection featuring Sherwanis, Kurtas and headgear at the Lakme Fashion Week Spring Summer 09 Grand Finale show. He also started a kids wear line under the label Chota Sabhya.

In 2012, the designer styled a calendar for which Bollywood actress Neha Dhupia dressed up as famous painter Frida Kahlo, who has been the designer's inspiration for the Grand Finale at WIFW Autumn-Winter 2011 where the models walked the ramp wearing Frida Kahlo-esque rose headbands and wire-rimmed glasses.

Sabyasachi Mukherjee's Autumn Winter 2015 collection at Amazon India Couture Week (AICW) was a collaboration with French luxury footwear and fashion designer Christian Louboutin. 80 pairs of shoes, both for men and women, all embroidered with the quintessential Sabyasachi embroidery and embellished with hand-placed sequins, were created for the show. Louboutin also modified his signature Victoria heel for the collection, to be embroidered with the signature Sabyasachi embroidery using acid dyed burnt zardozi and vintage Parsi gara. The designer has exclusively collaborated with Bergdorf Goodman New York for handcrafted pieces of fine and bohemian jewellery during January to March 2020. His palatial estate in Alipore Calcutta was partly inspired from works of Bijoy Jain and Pierre Cardin.

Design philosophy

Sabyasachi's design philosophy is "personalized imperfection of the human hand". Deserts, gypsies, prostitutes, antique textiles and cultural traditions of his home town, Kolkata, have been a lifelong inspiration for this designer who believes that "clothes should just be an extension of one's intellect". He uses unusual fabrics, texturing and detailing, fusion of styles, patch-work with embellishments in a vibrant colors. His creations evoke images of ancient and medieval ages. He describes his own collections as "an International styling with an Indian soul".

He designs crafted bridal wear and rigorously structured pieces. On occasion, to the delight of his global audiences, the designer is known to draw inspirations from the wider world, such as exotic, indigenous ethnic European art such as the colourscapes of French impressionists like Monet and Henry Matisse in his clothes.

He pioneered the use of high-end luxury Indian textiles in a modern context. His unique contribution was the use of classical methods like bandhani, gota work, block printing, hand dyeing etc. in construction of modern silhouettes. Sabyasachi is especially famous for Indian Bridal Wear.

Revival initiatives

Mukherjee started a project called Save the Saree where he retails hand-woven Indian sarees on a non-profit basis priced at 3500 & the entire proceed goes to the weavers of Murshidabad. This initiative is also strongly supported by Film industry divas like Aishwarya Rai Bachchan, Vidya Balan.
He has been developing textiles from Dastkarin-Andhra Pradesh, Berozghar Mahili Samitiin-Bihar, Tantubay Samiti-Fulia and Kotpadin-Orissa.
The designer uses rich Indian fabrics in his collection - extensive use of Banarasi fabric can be seen in his range. Over the past two years he has also been involved in reviving cotton Benarasi sarees in pure khadi and vegetable hand block prints from Bagru.

He is one of the designers who, by his skillful use of Indian fabric Khadi brought it in the International platform. Sotheby's London hosted an exhibition of contemporary design named 'Inspired by India' where the designer showcased his work of khadi.
Sabyasachi's collection of Winter-Festive Lakme Fashion Week 2011 revived the finer version of Khadi.

Sabyasachi and Bollywood

The designer forayed into films by designing costumes for Sanjay Leela Bhansali's landmark film Black, which earned him critical acclaim along with the National Award in 2005 for the best costume designer for a feature film.
Since then, he has designed for other Bollywood movies such as Baabul, Laaga Chunari Mein Daag, Raavan, Guzaarish, Paa, No One Killed Jessica and English Vinglish.

In 2012, Sabyasachi appeared on NDTV Goodtimes' show Band Baja Bride.

The entire trousseau collection of around 18 hand-crafted sarees for Bollywood diva Vidya Balan's wedding was designed by Sabyasachi for which he specially sourced the silk from Chennai. Vidya Balan also wore seven of his outfits for her public appearances whilst serving on the competition jury panel at Cannes 2013.

Anushka Sharma wore a pale pink lehenga and Virat Kohli wore an ivory raw silk sherwani designed by Sabyasachi at their high-profile wedding on 11 December 2017.

Deepika Padukone wore a red lehenga and Ranveer Singh wore a red raw silk sherwani designed by Sabyasachi at their high-profile wedding on 14 November 2018.

For their second wedding, both Nick and Priyanka wore custom looks by Sabyasachi. Chopra wore a sparkling, crimson red lehenga made of hand-cut organza flowers, French knots in silk floss, and Siam-red crystals. It took 110 embroiderers in Calcutta and 3,720 hours to create this insanely intricate look.

Sabyasachi’s celebrity clientele also includes Samantha Akkineni, Rani Mukerji, Sridevi, Tabu, Shabana Azmi, Aishwarya Rai Bachchan, Anushka Sharma, Deepika Padukone, Priyanka Chopra, Shraddha Kapoor, Sushmita Sen, Radhika Pandit, Nita Dalal Ambani, Isha Ambani Piramal, Shloka Mehta Ambani, Radhika Merchant (members of Mukesh Ambani's family) and Kareena Kapoor Khan among several others.

Internationally, actresses Renée Zellweger and Reese Witherspoon, among others, have sported the label.

Store locations
The brand has flagship store locations in Kolkata, New Delhi, Mumbai, Hyderabad, and New York city. Limited pieces are also carried by other retailers in various parts of India, as well as select international retailers in California, Atlanta, London and Dubai.

Awards and distinctions
Best Designer of Hindustan at the MTV Lycra style awards
Society Achievers award for the best new Indian designer.
He is the only Indian designer to be requested to showcase at Italy's indigenous fashion showcase Milan Fashion Week 2004
Voted by Asia Inc. (a Singapore-based business magazine) as one of the ten most influential Indians in Asia

References

External links

profile at Fashion Design Council of India

1974 births
Living people
Clothing brands of India
Indian male fashion designers
Artists from Kolkata
National Institute of Fashion Technology alumni
21st-century Indian designers
Best Costume Design National Film Award winners